Sapucai is a town in the Paraguarí department of Paraguay.

Sources 
World Gazeteer: Paraguay – World-Gazetteer.com
Hansard– Mention of Sapucai steam locomotive workshop in UK's Parliament
 YouTube – Video of Sapucai steam locomotive workshop

Populated places in the Paraguarí Department